Ofnir may refer to:

 Ófnir, one of the names of the Germanic god Odin
 Ofnir, the 2015 debut album of European folk band Heilung